The Misznay–Schardin effect, or platter effect, is a characteristic of the detonation of a broad sheet of explosive.

Description 
Explosive blasts expand directly away from, and perpendicular to, the surface of an explosive. Unlike the blast from a rounded explosive charge, which expands in all directions, the blast produced by an explosive sheet expands primarily perpendicular to its plane, in both directions. However, if one side is backed by a heavy or fixed mass, most of the blast (i.e. most of the rapidly expanding gas and its kinetic energy) will be reflected in the direction away from the mass.

Uses 
The Misznay–Schardin effect was studied and experimented with by explosive experts József Misznay, a Hungarian, and Hubert Schardin, a German, who initially sought to develop a more effective antitank mine for Nazi Germany. Some sources claim that World War II ended before their design became usable, but they and others continued their work. Misnay designed two weapons: the 43M TAK antitank mine, the 44M LŐTAK side-attack mine and the M93 Hornet mine. The Hungarian army used these weapons in 1944–1945.

The later AT2 and M18 Claymore mines rely on this effect.

See also
High-explosive squash head
Explosively formed penetrator
Munroe effect

References

Explosives